The SunShot Initiative is a federal government program run by the US Department of Energy's Solar Energy Technologies Office. It bills itself as a national effort to support solar energy adoption in order to make solar energy affordable for all Americans. The initiative is a collaboration of private companies, universities, state and local governments, and nonprofits, as well as national laboratories.

Background 
The United States Department of Energy (DOE) announced its sponsorship of the SunShot Initiative in 2011 and was established as a way to; increase utility of, photovoltaic goods and services in the United States by decreasing its original costs in order to: (1)enable the competitiveness of the Solar Powered energy market, and supply chain comparatively to other energy sources, (2) increase the competitiveness of solar power energy market, (3) foster growth of research and development within the energy sector, specifically in solar energy alternatives, and (4) address the growing concern of climate change by triggering a more natural shift from fossil fuels to renewable energy sources in the long-run. The initial goal set forth by the SunShot Initiative is to reduce carbon emissions to 20% of what they were at their highest recorded levels in 1990, by 2050.

In order to achieve this goal, the DOE focused its efforts on using the increased feasibility of policy implementation processes in local governments to streamline the approach. By funding 25 major U.S. Cities through Solar America Program, the DOE sought to create readily available examples of the SunShot Initiative underlying mission at work. This in turn, would facilitate the study of effectiveness in implementation processes in an urban setting, and provide idealized planning model based on already implemented policies, their effects, and potential challenges that could be encountered for reference, and create future implementation in other U.S. cities. According to the cost/benefit analysis of cities participating in the Solar Cities America Program. These DOE efforts were geared towards incentivizing more U.S. cities to implement alternative energy source policies locally. As well as increase the availability of viable policies that can be used in order to facilitate the development of a broader national or state policy.

This initiative is meant to increase the availability of photovoltaic sources as viable alternatives to fossil fuels. As well as increase further analysis on the costs and benefits of solar power in the United States, through a comparative study on the mechanics of policy implementation in order to more effectively realize the overarching goal of the SunShot initiative. The growth of the solar market in the United States, as a result of the SunShot initiative, has greatly increased the accessibility to solar powered technology and increased its general utility throughout the country, by reducing costs to consumers. The DOE has created these incentives in order to: (1)facilitate the increase of research and development, and (2) to promote renewable energy sources amid the globalized calls for a solutions to climate change/global warming.

The federal government invested $282 million in FY 2015 to fund the SunShot Initiative. According to the SunShot Q4 2016/Q1 2017 Solar Industry Update report, The United States installed 14.8 GW of PV in 2016, an increase of 97% from 2015, representing approximately $30 billion in deployed capital, along with another $2.2 billion in U.S.- manufactured PV products.

By 2016, the program achieved 90% of the progress towards the 2020 goal. In September 2017, it was announced that it had already reached its 2020 goal, and was now refocusing on grid reliability issues.

Goals and mission
When the program was first launched in 2011 it set a series of goals and cost targets:
 $0.09 per kilowatt hour for residential photovoltaics (PV)
 $0.07 per kilowatt hour for commercial PV
 $0.06 per kilowatt hour for utility-scale PV
In 2016, the SunShot Initiative announced new cost targets that it wanted to be achieved by the year 2030:
 $0.05 per kilowatt hour for residential PV
 $0.04 per kilowatt hour for commercial PV
 $0.03 per kilowatt hour for utility-scale PV
According to the program, "These cost targets inform the decisions SunShot makes to spur the country’s solar market and drive deployment of solar energy."

Organization 
The SunShot Initiative is divided into five subprograms:
 Photovoltaics - supports the early-stage research and development of photovoltaic (PV) technologies that improve efficiency and reliability, lower manufacturing costs, and drive down the cost of solar electricity.
 Concentrating Solar Power - supports the development of novel CSP technologies that will lower cost, increase efficiency, and improve reliability compared to current state-of-the-art technologies.
 Systems Integration - seeks to enable the widespread deployment of secure, reliable, and cost effective solar energy on the nation’s electricity grid by addressing the associated technical and organizational challenges. 
 Soft Costs - addresses challenges associated with non-hardware costs of solar and remove market barriers to the adoption of solar energy technologies.
 Technology to Market - this subprogram investigates and validates groundbreaking, early-stage technology, software, and business models to strengthen early-stage concepts and move them toward readiness for greater private sector investment and scale-up to commercialization.
All subprograms issue competitive awards to universities, national laboratories, nonprofit organizations, solar companies, and state and local governments to fund research and development projects that will aid in lowering the cost of electricity generated from solar technology.

Below is a spending breakdown of the Soft Costs program for fiscal year 2015:
 $5.8 Million – Solar research at National Laboratories
 $17.4 Million – Funding pilot programs for solar incentives/subsidies
 $8 Million – Education training
 $6 Million – Study solar panel deployment on federal lands
 $5 Million – Studies on streamlining solar data to “increase access to financing”
 $2 Million – Using students to develop plans for local government policies that help solar

References

External links
 SunShot Initiative homepage
 How Does Solar Energy Work? SolarCity.

Solar power
Solar energy in the United States
Federal government of the United States
Energy policy